Andrew John Sexton (born 23 July 1979 at Southampton) is an English cricketer. He is a left-handed opening batsman and a right-arm off-break bowler. He played Minor Counties cricket during 1999 for Dorset before entering first-class cricket in 2000 with Hampshire.

For Dorset, he was a member of the team that reached the final of the 1999 Minor Counties Championship. He scored 196 in the second innings of the match after Dorset had been forced to follow on by Cumberland, but Cumberland still won the game by six wickets.

Sexton played only four first-class matches for Hampshire. In his first game against Durham, he scored 36 out of a total of 340 that included no individual 50s. He then failed to reach double figures in his next five innings before finishing his first-class career with 16 in the match against New Zealand A.

He was a regular member of the Hampshire side that won the Second XI Championship in 2001, but left the county after that.

References

Andrew Sexton at Cricket Archive

1979 births
English cricketers
Living people
Hampshire cricketers